GripeO was an online complaint portal based in Buffalo, New York which allowed consumer users to submit feedback for businesses.  Consumer feedback, called "gripes" in the system, could be submitted via the GripeO website, iOS app, or Android app.  That feedback is then delivered to the business via social media, primarily through Twitter.

History

Origins (2012) 
The idea for a consumer facing customer service portal was initially created after a personal experience with a knife that broke while cutting a pizza.  The co-founders joined the company to assist with building a minimum viable product, later three other technical co-founders joined to take the product to completion.

BETA and Z80 Labs (2013-2014) 
During much of 2013 the company ran various beta programs and surveys to assess user feedback on a potential GripeO system, as well as completed research to justify continued development.

GripeO developed a relationship Z80 Labs Technology Incubator, co-managed by two venture capitalists. In December 2014, GripeO closed a $200,000 seed funding round, with funds arising from Z80 Labs and Angel investors.

Further reading 
 The Best Services That Ease Your Customer Service Experience by LifeHacker
 Save of the Day:  End bad customer service with this app by USA Today
 How to rattle a company's cage by Consumer Reports

References

External links

Marketing companies of the United States
Internet properties established in 2012